Shadow Assassins (2022) is a Hindi movie directed by Nilaanjan Reeta Datta and written by Nilaanjan Reeta Datta, Rohit Kumar, Raaghav Dar and Bhushan Ingole. The movie is based on 1990s Secret killings of Assam.

Cast 
 Anurag Sinha as Nirbhay kalita
 Mishti Chakraborty as Rimli Bora
 Hemant Kher as Dr.Dhiren Kalita
 Rakesh Chaturvedi Om as Police Inspector
 Ranjeev lal Baruah as Bhavik
 Monuj Borkotoky as Debojit
 Ranjita Boruah as Puravi Kalita
 Stuti Choudhury as Ratna Kalita
 Bibhuti Bhushan Hazarika as News Editor
 Rohit Kp as Chinmoy
 Soumya Mukherjee as Rishab Banerjee
 KP Sandhu as Neeraj Deka
 Saharsh Kumar Shukla as	kamal Sharma
 Akash Sinha	as Mukul
 Violet Nazir Tiwari as Mother

Plot 
The story of the film narrates about Nirbhay Kalita. Kalita leaves his home in Guwahati, Assam, with dreams of starting a new chapter in life on a college campus in Pune, Maharashtra. But his life gets stuck in the world of vengeance when his near and dear ones are assassinated.

Soundtrack

Release 
The film was released in theatres on December 9, 2022. The film will now release in Singapore on 9th February.

Reception 
"Sanjukta Sharma" wrote in " Money Control " Shadow Assassins a rare Hindi Film that gets The North East right". "Bollywood wallah" "Sonup" reviewed the film as a milestone film with great Direction screenplay and Acting. "Filmi Fever" Ravi Gupta opined that it is as important a film as Kashmir Files and finds the screenplay interesting. "Komal Nahta for  "Film Information" wrote "Shadow Assassins is for a thin section of the audience in Assam only, because the story is about happenings in that state. For the rest of the world, there’s precious little in the film. Flop." Ambar Chatterjee for "EastMojo" wrote "I watched Shadow Assassins in a practically empty theatre. This brings me to the point that I have raised numerous times before. We have to support our regional cinema and our own stories. If a film like this fails at the box office, it will deter many others from making films on similar subjects or on Assam as a whole."

References